Thomas Denniston (28 March 1821 – 14 September 1897) was a New Zealand farmer and newspaper editor. He was born in Greenock, Renfrewshire, Scotland on 28 March 1821. He contested the  electorate in the  but of the three candidates, he came last. His eldest son, Sir John Denniston, was a judge at the Supreme Court in Christchurch.

References

1821 births
1897 deaths
Scottish emigrants to New Zealand
New Zealand writers
New Zealand farmers
Unsuccessful candidates in the 1871 New Zealand general election